Jakarta Special Capital Region I, abbreviated as DKI Jakarta I, is an electoral district in Indonesia which encompasses of East Jakarta in the Jakarta Special Capital Region. Since 2014, this district has been represented by six members of People's Representative Council (DPR RI).

Components 
 2004–2009: Central Jakarta, East Jakarta, North Jakarta, dan Thousand Islands Regency
 2009–present: Redistricted into East Jakarta

List of members 
The following list is in alphabetical order. Party with the largest number of members is placed on top of the list.

See also 
 List of Indonesian national electoral districts

Reference 

Electoral districts of Indonesia